Donnie Munro (Scottish Gaelic: Donaidh Rothach /dɔnɪ rɔhəx/) (born 2 August 1953) is a Scottish musician, and former lead singer of the band Runrig.

A native speaker of Scots Gaelic, much of his work is in that language.

Early life
Munro was born in Uig, Isle of Skye in the Inner Hebrides.  He attended Gray's School of Art in Aberdeen and earned a postgraduate degree in teaching at Moray House in Edinburgh.

Music career
He first saw Runrig play in 1973 and was approached one year later to become a member of the band. As lead singer of Runrig, Munro became established as a Gaelic music performer of the 1980s and 1990s.

Munro left Runrig in 1997 to pursue a career in politics. His final performance was a farewell concert at Stirling Castle on 29 August.

Munro released a solo  album, Heart of America, done in collaboration with fellow Skye songwriters Blair Douglas and Richard Macintyre, and won Album of the Year in the Scottish TradMusic Awards 2006. He continues to work as the Director of Development at Sabhal Mòr Ostaig, Scotland's National Centre for the Gaelic Language and Culture on Skye.

Munro completed a series of live shows titled 'An Turas - The Journey', with a forty piece ensemble and is preparing for the release of a live album, recorded at the Royal Concert Hall in Glasgow, during Celtic Connections 2008.

For Runrig's 40th anniversary at the Black Isle show ground at Muir of Ord on 10 August 2013, Munro appeared as a special guest and performed three songs. For Runrig's farewell concert, "The Last Dance" in City Park, Stirling, on 18 August 2018, Munro appeared as a special guest, performing two songs.

Politics
Munro was elected as Rector of the University of Edinburgh in 1991, a position he held until 1994. He contested the UK Parliamentary seat of Ross, Skye and Inverness West in the 1997 General Election but was defeated by Charles Kennedy (Liberal Democrat).  He then contested the Scottish Parliament seat of Ross, Skye and Inverness West at the 1999 Scottish Parliament election for Labour, but was defeated by Liberal Democrat John Farquhar Munro. These necessitated his leaving the band, which he did in 1997.  His reasons for departure were a matter for lengthy private discussion over a two-year period but were never the subject of public discourse.

Munro was alleged to have given up the offer of a 'safe' Labour seat in Central Scotland as he had already agreed and been adopted as a candidate to contest his own native Highland constituency, coming close to winning this hitherto safe Liberal Democrat seat in the 1999 Scottish election.

Honours
In 1996 he gave the Sabhal Mòr Lecture.

In 1998 Munro was elected as the first rector of the UHI Millennium Institute, a post that lasted 3 years.

Solo discography

Studio albums
 On The West Side (1999)
 Across The City And The World (2002)
 Gaelic Heart (2003)
 Heart Of America (Across The Great Divide) (2006)

Live albums
 Donnie Munro Live (2000)
 Donnie Munro And Friends (2006)
 Donnie Munro Live - An Turas (2008)
 Sweet Surrender - Live Acoustic (2015)

Compilation albums
 Fields Of The Young (2004)
 Donnie Munro - Best Of (2005)

References

External links
Official Website
Sabhal Mòr Ostaig Website

1953 births
Living people
Labour Party (UK) parliamentary candidates
University of the Highlands and Islands
20th-century Scottish male singers
Alumni of the University of Edinburgh
Alumni of Robert Gordon University
People from the Isle of Skye
Rectors of the University of Edinburgh
Sabhal Mòr Ostaig
Runrig members
Scottish rock musicians
Scottish Gaelic singers
21st-century Scottish male singers
People educated at Portree High School
Alumni of Gray's School of Art